My Way is the debut studio album by Akufen, an alias of electronic musician Marc Leclair. The album was released by Force Inc. Records on May 14, 2002. The album has over 2000 samples of radio feed on it.

Critical reception
Andy Kellman of AllMusic described the album as "a terrifically delightful, upbeat record, tipsy with buoyant basslines, swooning textures, and unorthodox hooks." Olli Siebelt of BBC said, "My Way manages to walk a fine line between full-on commercial sensibility and left-field experimentation and yet somehow pulls off both simultaneously with no compromise on either side."

The album was listed on The Wires "2002 Rewind" list. It was named the 12th best album of the decade by Resident Advisor. In 2015, it was named the 81st greatest dance album of all time by Thump.

Track listing

Personnel
Credits adapted from the original edition's liner notes.

 Marc Leclair – production
 Marc Hohmann – art direction, design
 Akiko Tsuji – art direction, design

References

External links
 
 

2002 debut albums
Marc Leclair albums